Libertine Humiliations is the fifth studio album by the French progressive death metal band Misanthrope.

Track listing

 "Misanthrope Necromancer" - 5:02
 "Matador de l'extrême - 4:43
 "At 666 Days..." - 4:00
 "L'écume des Chouans" - 5:37
 "Total Eclipse Chaos" - 4:27
 "Sous l'éclat blanc du nouveau millénaire" - 5:13
 "Crisis of Soul" - 4:27
 "Combattant sans sépulture" - 5:04
 "Antiquary to Mediocrity" - 4:26
 "Humiliations libertines" - 5:20

References
Misanthrope's official website

1997 albums
Misanthrope (band) albums